Göreme is a village of around 2,000 people in Nevşehir province in Central Anatolia. It is well known for its fairy chimneys (Turkish: peribacalar), eroded rock formations, many of which were hollowed out in the Middle Ages to create houses, churches and underground cities. Göreme was formerly known as Korama, Matiana, Macan and Avcilar.

Göreme sits at the heart of a network of valleys filled with astonishing rock formations. It also has the most painted churches in Cappadocia. When the nearby Göreme Valley was designated to become the most important tourist centre for Cappadocia (Turkish: Kapadokya), the village's name was changed to Göreme for practical reasons.

Once an agricultural settlement, modern Göreme is best known for its flourishing tourism industry, in particular for its hot air balloon rides and many boutique hotels created out of old cave homes. The village sits within the Göreme National Park which was added to the UNESCO World Heritage List in 1985.

The nearest airports are Nevşehir Kapadokya Airport and Kayseri Airport. The village is also served by long-distance buses from all over Turkey.

History 

Very little is known about Göreme's history until modern times in part because it was a small settlement away from the more travelled main roads linking Kayseri to Konya and the Mediterranean coast to Aksaray. The village contains several pillared tombs believed to date back to Roman times. In Byzantine times what is now Göreme was actually two separate but adjacent villages: Corama where the modern Open Air Museum can be found, and Matiana/Macan where the modern village is. The first written record of Matiana and Corama appears in the proceedings of the Council of Chalcedon in 451 which was attended by representatives of both the settlements. A Life oI St Hieron, the patron saint of Göreme, written in the sixth century nevertheless refers to events in the third century and offers the first mention of villagers living in cave houses. Some of the simpler cave churches around the village date from the sixth and seventh centuries, others from the tenth and eleventh centuries which is also when many of the frescoes were painted.

The single finest non-religious building in Göreme was constructed in 1796. It is usually referred to as the Mehmet Paşa Konağı (Mehmet Paşa Mansion) although the true name of the original owner is unknown. The walls of its selamlık (men's room) and haremlik (women's room) are completely covered with murals, those in the men's room featuring images of Constantinople mosques and landscapes, those in the women's room more domestic.

The first Westerner writer to leave an account - and drawing - of Göreme was the French archaeologist Charles Texier who passed through in the 1830s. In a book based on his travels in 1837 Sir William Hamilton referred to the chapel of St Hieron and the so-called Roma Kalesi (Roman Castle) in Göreme.

Troglodytism 
The malleable nature of the rocks and cones in and around Göreme has meant that people have carved out cave homes here from at least the third century (and probably from long before). The earliest such homes were probably simple caves but by the 20th century most of the houses (except those in single cones) had stone rooms built in front of the caves for families to live in while the caves were relegated to stabling and storage. The houses were designed to suit a place-specific way of life, with mangers for the animals cut from the rock along with presses used to tread grapes and later to make pekmez (grape molasses). Tandır ovens cut into the floors doubled as heating. This was a way of life that continued right into the first decade of the 21st century but that came to an effective end as a result of a tourism book that saw almost all the old houses converted into boutique hotels by around 2015.

Tourism 
Göreme was little visited by tourists until the 1970s but by 2000 had become the tourist capital of Cappadocia. Tourism brought wealth and a better standard of living to the village but it has completely changed not just the use of the old cave buildings within the village which have almost all been converted into hotels but also the lives of the villagers, almost all of whom now work in tourism. Many erstwhile residents have moved to live in the surrounding towns and villages - Nevşehir, Avanos, Uçhisar and Ürgüp - having sold their houses in Göreme for conversion into hotels. In the second decade of the 21st century an increasing number of hotels started to be built or bought by investors from outside Göreme.

Attractions 
Modern Göreme is probably best known for its hot-air balloon industry although many visitors also come here to visit the frescoed medieval churches and walk in the network of valleys with their extraordinary rock formations.

The churches 
Göreme Open Air Museum (Göreme Açık Hava Müzesi), one of Turkey's most-visited tourist attractions, preserves some of the best of the rock-cut, frescoed churches for which Cappadocia is known. However, there are also a few other churches in and around the village itself: the Bezirhane, Durmus Kadir, Orta Mahaalle, Karabulut, Yusuf Koç churches  Aynalı, El Nazar  and Saklı  churches.

The valleys 
Deep valleys run out of Göreme on all sides and make for excellent walking although not all are well signed. Some of them contain little-visited rock-cut churches; most are dotted with pigeon-houses from the days when local farmers reared pigeons to use their guano for fertiliser. Probably the best known of the valleys is Pigeon Valley (Güvercinlik Vadesi) which runs between Göreme and neighbouring Uçhisar. Also popular is the Rose Valley (Güllüdere Vadesi) which contains the remains of the Column Church (Kolonlu Kilise) and several others. Other valleys to explore include the Zemi Valley (Zemi Vadesi), the Valley of the Swords (Kılıçlar Vadesi)  and the Kızılçukur Valley.

Gallery

See also 
 Churches of Göreme, Turkey
 Ürgüp

References 

 Hometown Travel Goreme

External links 

Goreme Open Air Museum: https://www.destinations.com.tr/goreme-open-air-museum/
  
 

Towns in Turkey
Cappadocia
Populated places in Nevşehir Province
Geography of Nevşehir Province
Tourist attractions in Nevşehir Province